Emerald Park, known from 2010 to 2022 as Tayto Park, is an amusement park in Ireland, originally themed based on the Irish potato crisp brand Tayto. It is located in the townland of Kilbrew, in County Meath and was founded by farmer-turned-entrepreneur Raymond Coyle (d. 2022).

History 
The park opened on 24 November 2010. It was designed by Stewart and Sinnott Architects, landscaper Anthony Ryan and designer Milo Fitzgerald, with an €8.5 million investment from Ray Coyle, the potato farmer who established Largo Foods, and bought out the Tayto brand. The park developed 22 hectares of County Meath farmland into and includes Ireland's only wooden roller coaster, a Maxi Dance Party 360, adventure playgrounds and an exotic zoo.  It is the sixth most popular paid-for attraction in Ireland, with 750,000 visitors in 2015.

In February 2022, it was announced that the park would be rebranded in 2023 after Tayto Snacks confirmed they would not be renewing their sponsorship agreement. On 29 September 2022, it was announced that the park would be renamed "Emerald Park" from 1 January 2023, with reference to Ireland's nickname of the "Emerald Isle."

General attractions 
Emerald Park has attractions for all ages, including playgrounds, mazes, vortex tunnels, a 5D cinema, zip lining, arts and crafts, magic shows and face painting.

Zones

Eagle Sky Adventure Zone

Junior Zone
The Junior Zone features a 10-metre shot tower manufactured by Zamperla, a steam train ride, a car driving experience manufactured by Nissan, a spinning roller coaster manufactured by Visa, a spinning boat non-water ride and a leaping ride manufactured by Zamperla.

The Zoo
Emerald Park is an accredited zoo with BIAZA and EAZA, it is home to a diverse zoo animal collection which home to many conservation dependent species. Access to the zoo is included in the entry to Emerald park. The award-winning zoo is committed to conservation education and research. The collection features animals including big cats, primates, exotic birds, rare breeds of farm animals as well as native Irish birds of prey. As well as three visitor experiences, the "Petting farm", "World of Raptors" a free flying bird of prey display and "Lemur walk".

The mission of Emerald Park is dedicated to creating adventure, passing on knowledge, conserving nature, and serving the community.

Incidents 
A number of minor incidents have occurred within Emerald Park.

In June 2012 a former employee who was working as a tour guide broke her ankle after she went down a 60-foot slide. The slide was not open to the public at the time but she, along with other employees, were told to try it so that they could "get a feel of it". She sued Ashbourne Visitor Centre Ltd, trading as Tayto Park, as a result of the accident. She also sued Hags Aneby AB of Sweden and Spraoi Linn Ltd, the manufacturer and supplier of the slide respectively. The case was settled out of court. Following the accident, the ride was altered in relation to how steep it was and at the turns.

In October 2016, a wooden staircase in one of the park's Halloween attractions, "House of Horrors" suddenly collapsed, injuring nine people.

References

External links
 Official website

Amusement parks in Ireland
Tourist attractions in the Republic of Ireland
Tourist attractions in County Meath
Zoos in the Republic of Ireland